Skofield Park is a  natural open space preserve and city park located within Santa Barbara, California.   Rattlesnake Canyon Park is located nearby, with both in the "front country" of the Santa Ynez Mountains.

History
The land was formerly owned by Ray Skofield, and originally used as a camp for "Los Rancheros Vistadores," a men's riding group which Skofield was a founder of in 1930. When the surrounding area began getting more developed, Los Rancheros sold the land to the City for a park for $145,000 in May 1954.

Features
Features of the park include a nature path, picnic areas, bird watching, and native oak groves.  It also has the city's only reservable campgrounds. The parking area for Skofield Park is also used for nearby Rattlesnake Canyon Park and the Rattlesnake Canyon Trail.

References 

Parks in Santa Barbara, California
Campgrounds in California
Santa Ynez Mountains